= Grammar School Rawalpindi =

High school in Rawalpindi, Pakistan

Coordinates: 33°35′07″N 73°05′43″E

Information
- Established: 1986; 39 years ago

Grammar School Rawalpindi (GSR) is a high school which is located in Rawalpindi, Pakistan.

It has separate junior and senior section buildings in Chaklala and Lalazar and a primary section at Rah-e-aman, Adiala road.

The school prepares students for the Secondary school Certificate (Matriculation) examination conducted by the Federal Board of Intermediate and Secondary Education (FBISE) at its Chaklala and Lalzar branches, and for O levels examinations of the University of London at its Chaklala branch.

== History ==
The school was founded in 1986 by Nasreen Iqbal.

In 2002, the school received UNESCO Peace Pillar Award.
